Rudolf Reder a.k.a. Roman Robak (April 4, 1881 – October 6, 1977) was one of only two Holocaust survivors of the Bełżec extermination camp who testified about his experience after the war. He submitted a deposition to the Main Commission for the Investigation of German Crimes in January 1946 in Kraków. In terms of the number of Polish Jews who perished in its gas chambers, Bełżec had the third highest death toll among the six Nazi death camps located in occupied Poland, estimated between 500,000 and 600,000 men, women and children. Only Auschwitz-Birkenau and Treblinka had a higher victim count.

The postwar testimony of Reder was of special significance, because Chaim Hirszman, who also survived Bełżec, joined the new communist militia in Stalinist Poland tasked with the crushing of Polish underground, torture, makeshift executions, and mass deportation to Siberia of over 50,000 political undesirables. Hirszman was shot in March 1946 at his residence by the Cursed soldiers from TOW, in the course of an anti-communist insurrection against the new regime, before he was able to give a full account of his camp experience.

Life
Reder ran his own soap factory in Lemberg (then in the Austrian Partition, now Lviv in Ukraine) until 1910, according to the Bełżec Museum website. He married Feiga (née) Felsenfeld. The couple had two children, daughter Freida (Zofia) born in 1908 (or 1916) and a son Boruch (Bronisław), in 1907. Historian Dariusz Libionka wrote that Reder was in the United States until 1919. He returned to Lwów in already sovereign Poland and resumed (or perhaps, only began) soap production with the newly acquired knowledge. During the Holocaust, he lost his first wife and both children. Reder, age 61, was deported to Bełżec on August 11, 1942, with one of the first transports of Jews from the Lwów Ghetto after the new larger gas chambers were erected of brick and mortar. Because of his good knowledge of German, he was not sent off to die, but assigned to the Sonderkommando with a handful of others. At the ramp he claimed to have been a machinist, and for the next three months performed maintenance on engine for the gas chambers among other tasks. At the end of November 1942, during the prisoner transport to Lviv for camp supplies and sheet metal, he escaped under cover of darkness. A Ukrainian woman, his former employee, helped him first, as did the Polish Righteous Joanna Borkowska whom Rudolf Reder married after the war and later emigrated with, settling in Toronto, Canada. He and his second wife, Joanna, are buried at Mount Pleasant Cemetery, in Toronto. It was previously believed that he had died in 1968, rather than 1977.

Reder's book
Soon after the Soviet takeover, whilst still in Poland, Reder testified in January 1946 in Kraków before the Central Commission for Investigation of German Crimes (known as the Institute of National Remembrance at present). In the same year, he published his testimony in a book, with the help of the Jewish Historical Committee in Kraków. His monograph titled Bełżec was written in Polish with the Preface by his editor, Nella Rost, and illustrated with a map by Józef Bau, a Holocaust survivor who studied at the Academy of Fine Arts. In the book, Reder wrote about what he saw as the motor-maintenance worker, and what he learned afterwards:

Reder changed his name to Roman Robak in 1949 and left Poland for Israel in 1950. He emigrated with his second wife to Canada in 1953. In 1960, he submitted a deposition at the prosecutor’s office in Munich as part of the German preparations for the Belzec trial against eight former SS members of Bełżec extermination camp personnel. Further information on Reder is scant. His second daughter married Leonard Shenker (Szenker) and settled in Great Britain. His account of the Belzec camp imprisonment, published in 1946, was reprinted in 1999 by Auschwitz-Birkenau State Museum with Fundacja Judaica in bilingual edition featuring an English translation by Margaret M. Rubel, then issued again as "Belzec" in Polin: Studies in Polish Jewry (volume 13, 2000), and republished in the UK as part of a book titled I Survived a Secret Nazi Extermination Camp by Mark Forstater in 2013.

Bibliography

Notes

Citations

References
 

1881 births
1977 deaths
Belzec extermination camp
Belzec extermination camp survivors
Polish Jews
Polish emigrants to Canada
Canadian people of Polish-Jewish descent